Dyfed–Powys Police is the territorial police force in Wales policing Carmarthenshire, Ceredigion and Pembrokeshire (which make up the former administrative area of Dyfed) and the unitary authority of Powys (covering Brecknockshire, Radnorshire and Montgomeryshire). The force was formed in 1968, with the merger of the Carmarthenshire and Cardiganshire Constabulary, the Pembrokeshire Constabulary and the Mid Wales Constabulary.

It includes many remote rural communities and a number of old industrial areas that are currently undergoing significant change and redevelopment. The population is under 500,000, although it is boosted each year with many tourist visitors.

The force's headquarters is in Carmarthen.

, the force had 1,145 police officers, 87 special constables, 143 police community support officers (PCSO), 55 police support volunteers (PSV), and 674 staff.

Proposed merger
On 6 February 2006, the Home Secretary Charles Clarke proposed to merge Dyfed–Powys Police with North Wales Police, South Wales Police and Gwent Police, to form one strategic force for all of Wales. Fierce opposition to the proposed changes followed from many quarters during the summer of 2006. John Reid, the new Home Secretary from 5 May 2006, abandoned the proposed restructuring of the police service in England and Wales.

In March 2022, Chief Constable Richard Lewis suggested that the four Welsh police forces should merge within eight years. If it happened, it would make the third-largest police force in England and Wales, with more than 7400 police officers.

Budget cuts
In 2010, it was announced that most UK public services would be subject to budget cuts over the next five years. Dyfed–Powys Police is one of these public services faced with this problem and had to find savings of £34million between 2010 and 2015, and £13 million in each subsequent year. Chief Constable Ian Arundale warned that there was going to be a "significant impact" on the front line.

Arundale said he accepted that cuts had to be made in the Dyfed–Powys force area and hoped to achieve this through natural wastage and voluntary redundancies. However, in 2011 the police service announced the recruitment of 39 new officers, 18 Police Constables and 21 Special Constables, showing commitment to the communities it serves during difficult financial times.

Special constabulary
In late 2010/early 2011, Dyfed–Powys Police service restructured its special constabulary. This is the part-time volunteer section; its officers are known as special constables, all of whom hold the office of constable no matter what their rank, or informally as specials.

The current special constabulary management structure is:
Special constabulary lead – A regular superintendent
Special constabulary co-ordinator
Special constabulary chief officer
Special constabulary inspector; four inspectors, one per basic command unit (BCU)
Special constabulary sergeants; formerly section officers

Chief constables
 1974 J Ronald Jones
 1975–1986 : Richard Thomas
 1986–1989 : David Shattock
 1989–2000 : Ray White
 2000–2007 : Terry Grange
 2008–2012 : Ian Arundale
 2012 : Jackie Roberts (temporary)
 2013–2016 : Simon Prince
 2016–2021 : Mark Collins
2021: Claire Parmenter (temporary)
 2021present : Richard Lewis

In 2007, following a complaint, and during an investigation by the Independent Police Complaints Commission (IPCC) into financial irregularities, Chief Constable Terry Grange retired with immediate effect. Dyfed–Powys Police Authority said it had accepted with regret his retirement with immediate effect, adding that Grange "had indicated that he had allowed his private life to interfere with his professional role. This has led the police authority to consider the chief constable's position and it was considered to be appropriate to accept his retirement." The IPCC continued its investigation after his retirement. In newspapers of 25 November, it emerged that Grange was accused of letting his personal relationship with a judge interfere with the force's handling of child abuse claims against the judge – Grange was the Association of Chief Police Officers (ACPO) spokesperson on child abuse issues.

See also
Dyfed-Powys Police and Crime Commissioner
List of law enforcement agencies in the United Kingdom, Crown Dependencies and British Overseas Territories
Law enforcement in the United Kingdom

References

External links

 DyfedPowys Police at HMICFRS
Dyfed–Powys Police – Website to engage with young people (archived)

Police forces of Wales
Ceredigion
Organisations based in Carmarthenshire
Pembrokeshire
Dyfed
Powys
1968 establishments in Wales
Government agencies established in 1968
Welsh police authorities